Kira Kira Happy ★ Hirake! Cocotama is a Japanese anime television series animated by OLM, Inc. and a sequel to Kamisama Minarai: Himitsu no Cocotama, based on both the series of toys and Media Franchise created by Bandai Namco Holdings. The series was directed by Norio Nitta and written by Michihiro Tsuchiya (Mirmo De Pon!, PriPara, Cross Game) with character designs by Shinobu Ookawa. The series aired on all TXN stations in Japan on September 6, 2018 to September 26, 2019, replacing Himitsu no Cocotama on its initial timeslot.

An original net animation spinoff, titled Mono no Kamisama Cocotama began airing online at September 26, 2019 on YouTube.

Story

Long time ago, Haruka Hoshinogawa made a wish with the town's old cherry blossom tree with her grandfather while receiving a present from him: a cherry blossom ribbon. As she grew up, she treasured the gift that was given to her while starting fifth grade in her school. One day, upon noting that the old cherry blossom tree is wilting, her grandfather decided to leave the shop to explore the world and let Haruka take care of the store in his absence. The next day while sleeping, her treasured ribbon sprouted a strange egg, revealing a Cocotama, a god born from an object that has been cherished with love and care. Haruka woke up and accidentally saw the Cocotama on the table, retreated to her Hiding Egg. As Haruka picked it up, it has changed into a mysterious key. Left with some questions, the Cocotama introduced herself as Ribbon and Haruka learned about the existence of her kind and the mysteries behind the strange key she had. Ribbon realized that the key is actually the Key of Wonders, and that Haruka was chosen by it to be the Legendary Contractor to the Cocotamas. Now, both of them try to run the shop and meet new Cocotama friends, while discovering the mysteries and powers behind the Key of Wonders.

Production
The sequel series was first teased back on June 6, 2018 before the 2018 Tokyo Toy Fair. The series was fully revealed on the franchise's official Twitter page and livestream on June 7, 2018, which reveals the basic premise, characters and the new set of toys that would be released in Fall 2018. Part of the attendants of the livestream were the voice actors of the new characters: Minami Takahashi, Inori Minase and Mariya Ise. They confirmed in stage that they would voice the new characters in the show, with Ise saying that she loved her role in the first series after 3 years, and that she will do her best in the sequel. Later on, on August 24, Manga artist Yuka Fujiwara  is confirmed to be the character concept designer for the series.

Media

Merchandise
The , released in September 2018. It retains the same concept as the previous dollhouse set but with a new feature of interactivity. Unlike the first series, the Cocotama Figures each has a special pin on the bottom, on which connected to a compatible set will activate special lights and sounds depending on each figure. Aside from the figures, certain parts of the new dollhouse set can also be activated and opened using a key which is included with the first figure of the series or the deluxe edition of the Cocotama Music Box Castle Dollhouse set.

Anime

The anime based on the toyline, produced by OLM, aired From September 6, 2018 to September 26, 2019. Norio Nitta and Michihiro Tsuchiya returns as both director and writer for the series, with character design drafts from Yuka Fujiwara and character designs from Shinobu Ookawa and Shouji Yasukazu. The series's opening theme is titled  by Minami Takahashi, Inori Minase, Mariya Ise and Emiri Iwai while the first ending song is titled  by Kaoru Masaki on episode 1 to 29. The music for the sequel is composed by Ken Itō (Handa-Kun) and Kenichi Kuroda. Later, replaced by second ending song is titled  by Kaoru Masaki and Erika starting episode 30 onwards.

TV Tokyo officially streams the series in Japan as part of the Ani.TV Lineup on September 6, 2018. Bandai Channel also starts streaming the series in Japan as well in the video site Nico Nico Douga and in NTT DoCoMo's video streaming service Docomo Anime Store.

Original Net Animation

An Original net animation series titled Mono no Kamisama Cocotama began airing in YouTube on September 26, 2019, uniting the main characters of both the original series and the sequel. Unlike the TV series, this web series never include Kokoro Yotsuba and Haruka Hoshinogawa.

Notes

References

External links
  
 Official anime website (Series 2)  (TV Tokyo) 
 

2010s toys
Animated television series about children
Anime with original screenplays
Bandai Namco franchises
 
Mass media franchises
OLM, Inc.
TV Tokyo original programming
Toy brands
Toy figurines